Eulepidotis norduca is a moth of the family Erebidae first described by William Schaus in 1901. It is found in the Neotropics, including Mexico.

References

Moths described in 1901
norduca